The Porsche Carrera Cup Brasil and Porsche Sprint Challenge Brasil are the first ever one-make championships of Porsche in the continent of South America. It was first contested in 2005 and follows the same formula basis used in the Porsche Supercup and Porsche Carrera Cup championships held around the world.

The championship
The championship organization is supported by the motorsport division of Porsche AG together with their Brazilian representative, Stuttgart Sportcar, and is divided in two classes of competition:

Carrera Cup, that uses the same cars of the European series; Porsche 911 GT3 Cup (Type 992) with 4.0 liters, flat-6 naturally aspirated engines that produce 503 bhp (375 kW) and 470 N·m.
Sprint Challenge, that uses Porsche 911 GT3 Cup (Type 991.2) cars with a less-powerful engine.

Champions

Sprint Championship

Endurance Challenge

Overall

External links
 
 Porsche GT3 Cup Brazil at Driver Database

 
Auto racing series in Brazil
2005 establishments in Brazil
Sports leagues established in 2005
Motorsport competitions in Brazil